Free List may refer to:

Computer science
 Free list, a data structure used in dynamic memory allocation

Politics
 Free list, a form of open list party-list proportional representation system
 Free List (Liechtenstein), a centre-left political party in Liechtenstein
 Free List (Fria Listan), a defunct libertarian political party that contested the 2002 Swedish general election
 Free List of Farmers, the Middle Class and Workers, a defunct political party in Luxembourg

Economics 
Free lists show goods not subject to customs duty